The 2012 Fort Lauderdale mayoral election was held on February 14, 2012 to elect the mayor of Fort Lauderdale, Florida. It saw the re-election of Jack Seiler.

Results

References 

Fort Lauderdale
Mayoral elections in Fort Lauderdale
Fort Lauderdale